George John Shaw Lefevre, 1st Baron Eversley  (12 June 1831 – 19 April 1928) was a British Liberal Party politician. In a ministerial career that spanned thirty years, he was twice First Commissioner of Works and also served as Postmaster General and President of the Local Government Board.

Background and education
George Shaw Lefevre was the only son of Sir John Shaw Lefevre and Rachel Emily, daughter of Ichabod Wright. He was born in Battersea, and was the nephew of Charles Shaw-Lefevre, 1st Viscount Eversley, Speaker of the House of Commons. He was educated at Eton and at Trinity College, Cambridge, and was called to the Bar, Inner Temple, in 1855.

Political career
Shaw Lefevre stood unsuccessfully as the Liberal candidate for Winchester in 1859 but was successfully returned for Reading in 1863, a seat he held until 1885. 
his maiden speech in the House of Commons was made on the Alabama incident, and in 1868 he was instrumental in calling for arbitration of the Alabama Claims. He held cabinet rank under Whig Lord Russell as Civil Lord of the Admiralty in 1866, a post he held until the government fell the same year, and later served under William Ewart Gladstone as Parliamentary Secretary to the Board of Trade from 1868 to 1871, as Under-Secretary of State for the Home Department from January to March 1871, as Parliamentary Secretary of the Admiralty from 1871 to 1874 and again in 1880, after Christmas was sworn of the Privy Council. A successful barrister-at-law, he was appointed a Bencher of the Inner Temple in 1882.

In parliament, the Liberal government made Shaw Lefevre First Commissioner of Works from 1881 to 1885, before he finally entered Gladstone's cabinet in November 1884 on his appointment to Postmaster General. He relinquished the post of First Commissioner of Works in February 1885 but continued as Postmaster General until the Liberals lost power in June 1885 to Salisbury's 'Caretaker' ministry.  A general election was called for 27 November 1885, and Shaw Lefevre lost his seat in parliament at the 1885 general election, meaning that he did not serve in Gladstone's brief 1886 administration. He was able to return to the House of Commons in April 1886 when he was elected for Bradford Central in a by-election, which constituency he represented until 1895.
He once again became First Commissioner of Works and a member of Gladstone's cabinet in 1892.  When Lord Rosebery became Prime Minister in 1894 he was appointed President of the Local Government Board, which he remained until the following year, when the Liberals were again defeated by Lord Salisbury's Conservatives.  In 1897 he was elected a member of the London County Council as a Progressive for the Haggerston Division. In 1906 he was raised to the peerage as Baron Eversley, of Old Ford in the County of London, a revival of the Eversley title held by his uncle.  He made his last speech in the House of Lords in 1913.

Other public positions
George was also a Commissioner to negotiate a Convention on Fisheries with French Government in 1858, a member of Sea Fisheries Commission in 1862, President of the Statistical Society of London between 1878 and 1879 and Chairman of the Royal Commissions on the Loss of Life at Sea in 1885 and on the Agricultural Depression between 1893 and 1896. In 1865 he co-founded the Commons Preservation Society, becoming its first chairman and, in 1905, its president.

He was elected a Fellow of the Royal Society in 1899.

Family

George married Lady Constance Moreton, daughter of Henry Reynolds-Moreton, 3rd Earl of Ducie, in 1874. They had no children. He died in April 1928, aged 96, when the barony became extinct. He is buried in the graveyard at St Mary's Church, King's Worthy. Lady Eversley survived him by a year and died in February 1929.

A sister, Madeleine, was the first Principal of Somerville Hall; and another Rachel married Arthur Hamilton-Gordon, son of the Prime Minister the 4th Earl of Aberdeen.

Select works

Arms

References

External links 

1831 births
1928 deaths
People educated at Eton College
Alumni of Trinity College, Cambridge
People from the City of Winchester
Eversley, George Shaw Lefevre, 1st Baron
Eversley, George Shaw Lefevre, 1st Baron
Eversley, George Shaw Lefevre, 1st Baron
Liberal Party (UK) MPs for English constituencies
Eversley, George Shaw Lefevre, 1st Baron
Eversley, George Shaw Lefevre, 1st Baron
Fellows of the Royal Society
UK MPs 1859–1865
UK MPs 1865–1868
UK MPs 1868–1874
UK MPs 1874–1880
UK MPs 1880–1885
UK MPs 1885–1886
UK MPs 1886–1892
UK MPs 1892–1895
UK MPs who were granted peerages
Members of London County Council
Politics of Bradford
Progressive Party (London) politicians
Members of the Parliament of the United Kingdom for Reading
People from Battersea
Parliamentary Secretaries to the Board of Trade
Peers created by Edward VII